George Einon Bowen (June 1863 – 19 January 1919) was a Welsh international rugby union half back who played club rugby for Swansea and Llanelli. Bowen won four caps for Wales and also played cricket for Glamorgan. Later in his life he became the Mayor of Kidwelly.

Bowen was first selected for Wales on 26 February 1887 in a Championship game against Scotland at Raeburn Place, Edinburgh. Wales, under the captaincy of Bob Gould, were decimated by a free running Scotland who scored 12 tries against Wales without reply. Despite this terrible result, Bowen was selected again two weeks later to face Ireland, this time led out by Tom Clapp. On this occasion Wales won even though their Irish opposition scored more tries. Bowen played against both Ireland and Scotland again the following season. His final game was at Lansdowne Road in a match that saw eight Welsh internationals play their last game for Wales.

International matches played
Wales
 1887, 1888
 1887, 1888

Bibliography

References 

1863 births
1919 deaths
Glamorgan cricketers
Llanelli RFC players
Mayors of places in Wales
Rugby union players from Swansea
Swansea RFC players
Wales international rugby union players